The 1977 New Hampshire Wildcats football team was an American football team that represented the University of New Hampshire as a member of the Yankee Conference during the 1977 NCAA Division II football season. In its sixth year under head coach Bill Bowes, the team compiled an 8–2 record (3–2 against conference opponents) and finished third out of six teams in the Yankee Conference.

Schedule

References

New Hampshire
New Hampshire Wildcats football seasons
New Hampshire Wildcats football